WLMW FM 90.7 is a Christian radio station licensed to Manchester, New Hampshire, and owned by Knowledge for Life. WLMW airs programming from American Family Radio as well as some local programs. Al Kaprielian is the station's on-air meteorologist.

References

External links

American Family Radio stations
LMW
Manchester, New Hampshire
Radio stations established in 1997